The 1981–82 OB I bajnokság season was the 45th season of the OB I bajnokság, the top level of ice hockey in Hungary. Three teams participated in the league, and Ujpesti Dozsa SC won the championship.

Regular season

External links
 Season on hockeyarchives.info

Hun
OB I bajnoksag seasons
OB